The Yamaha RA41 is a racing motorcycle produced by Yamaha, for the 125cc class of Grand Prix motorcycle racing, in 1961.

References

RA41
Grand Prix motorcycles